Habbanatti is a village in Belgaum district in the southern state of Karnataka, India.

Hjabbanhatti is in Northern Karnataka in Belagavi Dist.

References

Villages in Belagavi district